Zagorac may refer to:

native name of a person from Zagorje
Zagorac (surname)
Zagorac, Višegrad, a village in Bosnia and Hercegovina